A Bill of Divorcement is a 1940 film directed by John Farrow. It was also known as Never to Love and was based on a 1921 British play of the same name, written by Clemence Dane that was filmed in 1932 with John Barrymore and Katharine Hepburn.

Plot
Hilary Fairchild (Adolphe Menjou) returns home after a long spell in a lunatic asylum. He has regained his sanity, but finds that his strong-willed daughter Sydney (Maureen O’Hara ) has grown up and is planning to marry and  his wife (Fay Bainter) has divorced him.

Cast
Maureen O'Hara as Sydney Fairchild
Adolphe Menjou as Hilary Fairchild
Fay Bainter as Margaret Fairchild
Herbert Marshall as Gray Meredith
Dame May Whitty as Hester Fairchild
Patric Knowles as John Storm
C. Aubrey Smith as Dr. Alliot
Ernest Cossart as Rev. Dr. Pumphrey
Kathryn Collier as Basset
Lauri Beatty as Susan

Production
The film was announced in November 1939 with the lead roles allocated to Adolphe Menjou and Maureen O'Hara. O'Hara had just moved to Hollywood with Charles Laughton and appeared in The Hunchback of Notre Dame. Producer Robert Sisk and director John Farrow had made a number of films together including the popular Five Came Back (1939). It was considered an "A" picture – Farrow and Sisk's first such movie at RKO.

Filming started 2 December 1939.

Reception
The film recorded a loss of $104,000.

References

External links

1940 films
1940 drama films
American black-and-white films
American drama films
American films based on plays
Films about divorce
Films directed by John Farrow
Films scored by Roy Webb
Films set in England
RKO Pictures films
1940s English-language films
1940s American films